Giovanni Battista Hodierna, also spelled as Odierna (April 13, 1597 – April 6, 1660) was an Italian astronomer at the court of Giulio Tomasi, Duke of Palma (Palma di Montechiaro). He compiled a catalogue of comets and other celestial objects containing some 40 entries, including at least 19 real and verifiable nebulous objects that might be confused with comets.

Biography
Hodierna was born in Ragusa, Sicily and died in Palma di Montechiaro. While serving as a Roman Catholic priest in Ragusa, he also practised astronomy.

In 1654 he published a book entitled De systemate orbis cometici, deque admirandis coeli characteribus that contained a catalogue of celestial objects. The work anticipated Messier's catalogue, but had little impact.  Messier seems not to have known of it.

Hodierna was prolific in publication, and his interests spanned many disciplines. In addition to his astronomical observations, he utilized optic microscopes to study insects, publishing on the multifaceted eye of flies and that in bee colonies only the queen is oviparous.

Works
Archimede redivivo colla stadera del momento, dove non solamente si insegna il modo di scoprire le frodi nella falsificazione dell'oro e dell'argento; mas si notifica l'uso delli pesi e delle misure civili presso diverse nazioni del mondo e di questo regno di Sicilia, Decio Cirillo publisher, Palermo, 1644.
Protei cælestis vertigines seu Saturni systema, Nicolo Bua, publisher, Panormita (1657).
La stella nuova e peregrina comparsa l'anno 1600 sul petto del cigno, scoverta nuovamente, Ignazio di Lazzari, Rome (1659).
De systemate orbis cometici; deque admirandis coeli characteribus, Nicolo Bua, publisher, Panormita (1654).

See also
List of Roman Catholic scientist-clerics

References

External links
 
 Biography @ SEDS
 Hodierna's Deep sky Observations @ SEDS
 A biography
 Hodierna's (1644) Opuscoli del dottor Don Gio. Battista Hodierna - digital facsimile from the Linda Hall Library

1597 births
1660 deaths
People from Ragusa, Sicily
17th-century Italian astronomers
Catholic clergy scientists
Scientists from Sicily